Tetriginae is a large subfamily of groundhoppers or pygmy grasshoppers. Members of Tetriginae occur on every continent except Antarctica.

Tribes and genera 
Tribes and genera include:

Dinotettigini
Auth. Günther, 1979; recorded distribution: tropical Africa, India, Philippines.
 Afrocriotettix Günther, 1938
 Dinotettix Bolívar, 1905
 Ibeotettix Rehn, 1930
 Lamellitettix Hancock, 1904
 Marshallacris Rehn, 1948
 Pseudamphinotus Günther, 1979

Tetrigini
Auth. Rambur, 1838

Tribe incertae sedis

References

External links

 

Tetrigidae
Articles created by Qbugbot
Orthoptera subfamilies